Dollie de Luxe were a Norwegian pop duo consisting of Benedicte Adrian (lead vocal) and Ingrid Bjørnov (keyboard and vocal). Their debut album Første Akt from 1980 was awarded Spellemannprisen. They represented Norway in the Eurovision Song Contest 1984 with the song "Lenge leve livet".

The duo Dollie was formed in 1980, and from 1984 called Dollie de Luxe. In 1985 they scored a Top 20 hit in France with their single "Queen of the Night/Satisfaction". Their musical Which Witch premiered at Bergen International Festival in 1987. The musical was staged at a West End theatre in London in 1992, with 76 performances. In 1995 they toured with the musical Henriette og hennes siste ekte menn, and also released the album Prinsessens utvalgte with selections from the musical.

Discography

Albums
1980: Første Akt   (Nor #3, Gold)
1981: Dollies dagbok  (Nor #10)
1982: First Act
1982: Rampelys   (Nor #36)
1984: Dollie de Luxe
1985: Rock vs. Opera   (Nor #7, Silver)
1987: Which Witch   (Silver)
1990: Which Witch på Slottsfjellet   (Nor #12, Gold)
1995: Prinsessens utvalgte
1999: Adrian/Bjørnov

Compilation albums
2001: Dollies beste

References

Norwegian pop music groups
Norwegian musical duos
Norwegian girl groups
Melodi Grand Prix contestants
Eurovision Song Contest entrants of 1984
Eurovision Song Contest entrants for Norway
Melodi Grand Prix winners
Musical groups established in 1980
1980 establishments in Norway
Musical groups disestablished in 1995
1995 disestablishments in Norway
Musical groups from Oslo